The 2018 LTP Charleston Pro Tennis was a professional tennis tournament played on outdoor clay courts. It was the second edition of the tournament and was part of the 2018 ITF Women's Circuit. It took place in Charleston, United States, on 30 April–6 May 2018.

Singles main draw entrants

Seeds 

 1 Rankings as of 23 April 2018.

Other entrants 
The following players received a wildcard into the singles main draw:
  Quinn Gleason
  Maria Mateas
  Emma Navarro
  Jessica Pegula

The following player received entry using a protected ranking:
  Allie Kiick

The following player received entry using a junior exempt:
  Whitney Osuigwe

The following players received entry from the qualifying draw:
  Paula Cristina Gonçalves
  Camilla Rosatello
  Katerina Stewart
  Iga Świątek

Champions

Singles

 Taylor Townsend def.  Madison Brengle, 6–0, 6–4

Doubles
 
 Alexa Guarachi /  Erin Routliffe def.  Louisa Chirico /  Allie Kiick, 6–1, 3–6, [10–5]

External links 
 Official website
 2018 LTP Charleston Pro Tennis at ITFtennis.com

2018 ITF Women's Circuit
2018 in American tennis
LTP Charleston Pro Tennis
2018 in American women's sports